Tricondylomimus  is an Asian genus of praying mantis in the family Gonypetidae. Formerly considered as a junior synonym of the genus Nemotha, Chopard's original genus name was restored in 2017.

Species 
The Mantodea Species File lists:
 Tricondylomimus coomani Chopard, 1930 – type species (locality Vietnam)
 Tricondylomimus intermedius Stiewe & Shcherbakov, 2017
 Tricondylomimus mirabiliis Beier, 1935

References

External links 
 

Mantodea genera
Insects of Southeast Asia
Iridopteryginae